Ian Webster (born ) a former Wales international rugby league footballer who plays as a  or . A well respected sports / business personality who is often engaged for leadership commentary or running analysis of sporting organisations.

Background
Webster was born in Whiston, Merseyside , England.
Firstly creating a significant world record of signing a professional sports contract at the age of 13.
Webster holds a world record, that is likely to stand the test of time, as Wales rugby league's world record point scorer (most points in one game)
Then transitioning into a world recognised boxer. (2x golden gloves champion, and Australian champion across 3 different weights)
Webster throughout his busy schedule as an athlete provided a foundation for other young athletes: investing in commercial property, business opportunities and an envious residential property portfolio throughout United Kingdom, Australia and the USA.

Webster once owned and run the popular Sportstek university throughout QLD for disengaged school students from varying backgrounds. Sportstek liquidated in 2016. However, in 2015 was reported as being worth 15 million dollars (Aus). Webster was linked to Petero Civonaceva, Jordan Belfort (better known as "the Wolf of Wall Street") and Rod Kafer (former Wallabies player) on his business endeavours.

Career
Webster is a Wales international.

He has previously played for St. Helens in the Super League, and also for the Widnes Vikings, and the Celtic Crusaders.

He was named in the Wales squad to face England at the Keepmoat Stadium prior to England's departure for the 2008 Rugby League World Cup.

In October 2013, Webster played for Wales in the 2013 Rugby League World Cup.

Ian is currently working as a Business development manager in Central Queensland, and has many high achiever accolades from his peers.

Ian is currently boxing in Australia and was the 2017 Australian Golden Gloves Champion. He will also represent Queensland in the Australian championship titles in Melbourne before turning professional in December.

References

External links
Central Queensland Comets profile
Celtic Crusaders profile
Profile at saints.org.uk

1986 births
Living people
Central Queensland Capras players
Crusaders Rugby League players
English rugby league players
English people of Welsh descent
People from Whiston, Merseyside
Rugby league hookers
Rugby league halfbacks
Rugby league players from St Helens, Merseyside
St Helens R.F.C. players
Wales national rugby league team players
Widnes Vikings players